Cilobamine is a drug which acts as a norepinephrine-dopamine reuptake inhibitor (NDRI) and has stimulant and antidepressant effects.

It can clearly be seen that the structure is based on dichloroisoprenaline that has been fused onto the bicycloalkane scaffold.

Synthesis

An intramolecular Dieckmann cyclization on methyl 4-(2-methoxy-2-oxoethyl)cyclohexanecarboxylate [1401222-79-4] (3) with sodium hydride base gives reaction Methyl 3-oxobicyclo[2.2.2]octane-2-carboxylate [30144-30-0] (4). Treatment with sodium nitrite introduces a isonitroso group adjacent to the ketone, giving 3-Hydroxyiminobicyclo[2.2.2]octan-2-one, CID:131066320 (5). Addition of the aryl Grignard reagent, and reduction of the oxime gives CID:154108204 (6). A reductive amination of the primary amino group with acetone then completed the synthesis of cilobamine (7).

See also 
 Fencamfamine
 Manifaxine

References 

Antidepressants
Chloroarenes
Stimulants
Norepinephrine–dopamine reuptake inhibitors
Phenylethanolamines